New Humanitarian may refer to:

Institutions
 New Humanitarian School, a school in Moscow

Media
 The New Humanitarian, a news agency formerly organised by a United Nations agency and known then as Integrated Regional Information Networks